Pixelfed is a free and open-source image sharing social network service. It is decentralized, therefore user data is not stored on a central server, unlike other platforms. Pixelfed uses the ActivityPub protocol which allows users to interact with other social networks within the protocol, such as Mastodon, PeerTube, and Friendica. Using this protocol makes Pixelfed a part of the Fediverse. The network is made up of several independent sites that communicate with one another, which is roughly comparable to e-mail providers. The parties involved do not all have to be registered with the same provider, but can still communicate with each other. Thus, users are able to sign up on any server and follow others on the other instances.

Much like Mastodon, Pixelfed implements chronological timelines without content manipulation algorithms. It also aims to be privacy-focused with no third party analytics or tracking. Pixelfed optionally organizes its media by hashtags, geo-tagging and likes based on each server. It also allows audiences to be distinguished in three ways and on a post-by-post basis: followers-only, public, and unlisted. Like several other social platforms, Pixelfed allows accounts to be locked, when followers must be pre-approved by the owner.

The server maintained by the main developer of Pixelfed requires users to be over 16 years old. Restrictions are different on different instances.

Features 
Pixelfed has photo sharing features similar to the Meta Platforms owned Instagram service. Users can post photos, stories (beta version) and collections (beta version) via an independent, distributed and federating photo community in the form of connected Pixelfed instances. Any posts from the users of same Pixelfed instance will appear on Local Feed while posts from other Fediverse instances will be available on Global Feed. Home Feed will show posts of followed users.  Discover displays images that may be of interest to users.

Each post allows for a maximum of 10 photos or videos. Pixelfed has some of Mastodon's features, including an emphasis on content discovery and content warnings.

Users can post up to 6 gigabytes depending on the instances currently. The development of official apps for both Android and iOS is still in progress.

The most popular Pixelfed server is pixelfed.social with 54,200 users. The next popular English-language server, shared.graphics, has a community of 1,250 users.

Security 
Pixelfed supports two-factor authentication via TOTP mobile apps, such as 1Password, Authy Authenticator, LastPass Authenticator, Google Authenticator and Microsoft Authenticator.

Comparison with Instagram 
NLnet argued in 2020 that the tools and features of Pixelfed make it a "more attractive (and ethical) alternative" to Instagram.

In December 2022, John Voorhees wrote a detailed review of using Pixelfed on iOS, and said "Pixelfed is sort of like a decentralized version of Instagram that has adopted the ActivityPub protocol."

Reception 
In February 2023, in a detailed review of whether to leave Facebook, Twitter and Instagram for the metaverse, Andrew C. Oliver, Columnist for InfoWorld wrote, "Mastodon and Pixelfed feel safer than their non-federated counterparts" and said Pixelfed is the fediverse answer to Instagram. Oliver also said it is early days "in the Pixelfediverse", content is more sparse, but is either more interesting or at least not manipulative. Charlie Sorrel of Lifewire said Pixelfed shows the flexibility of Mastodon, and has the potential to be much better than Twitter because of ActivityPub.

Using Pixelfed has been discussed in books and conference proceedings.

See also 
 Distributed social network
 Comparison of software and protocols for distributed social networking

References

External links 
 

Fediverse
Free and open-source software
Free software
Web applications